Zhangixalus burmanus is a species of frog in the family Rhacophoridae.
It is found in Yunnan in southern China, Nagaland in northeastern India, and northern Myanmar.
Its natural habitats are subtropical or tropical seasonally wet or flooded lowland grassland, rivers, freshwater marshes, intermittent freshwater marshes, arable land, rural gardens, ponds, and aquaculture ponds.
It is threatened by habitat loss.

References

burmanus
Amphibians of Myanmar
Amphibians of China
Frogs of India
Taxonomy articles created by Polbot
Amphibians described in 1939
Taxa named by Lars Gabriel Andersson
Taxobox binomials not recognized by IUCN